Ryley Ben Towler (born 6 May 2002) is an English professional footballer who plays as a defender for  club Portsmouth.

Towler began his career with Bristol City, spending time on loan with Frome Town, Taunton Town, Grimsby Town and AFC Wimbledon.

Career

Bristol City

Towler joined his local City academy in the under 9 age group. A left footed player who went to Mangotsfield School, Towler is considered an option at left back or left centre back.

On 10 February 2021, Towler made his debut for Bristol City in the FA Cup fifth round starting away at Bramall Lane against Sheffield United.

On 9 September 2021, Towler joined Grimsby Town on loan until January 2022. Towler made his debut for the ‘Mariners’ on 11 September 2021, in a 1-3 away win against Torquay United. He went on to play 13 games in the National League for Grimsby Town, and one appearance in the FA Cup in a 1-0 defeat to Kidderminster Harriers. Towler was recalled on 20 December 2021 and returned to Bristol City.

On 1 September 2022, Towler joined AFC Wimbledon on loan for the 2022–23 season. He scored his first goal for Wimbledon in a 3–1 loss to Walsall on 8 October 2022. Towler was recalled from his loan on 6 January 2023.

Portsmouth
On 6 January 2023, Towler signed for League One club Portsmouth for an undisclosed fee on a three-and-a-half-year deal. He made his Pompey debut as a substitute against Bolton Wanderers in January 2023, and made his full debut a week later in a 2-0 home win over Exeter City. Towler scored two second-half goals in a 3–1 win over Bolton on 28 February 2023.

Career statistics

References

2002 births
Living people
Footballers from Bristol
English footballers
Association football midfielders
Bristol City F.C. players
Frome Town F.C. players
Taunton Town F.C. players
Grimsby Town F.C. players
AFC Wimbledon players
Portsmouth F.C. players
English Football League players
Southern Football League players
National League (English football) players